Olivia Newton-John and the Sydney Symphony Orchestra: Live at the Sydney Opera House is a HD video (16:9) released in 2008 for a tour of four concerts at the Sydney Opera House of singer Olivia Newton-John. The show was done in March 2006 with her band and Sydney Symphony conducted by Rick King. Produced by Olivia's Gaia Productions.

Cast
 Olivia Newton-John - vocal

Orchestra
 The Sydney Orchestra
 Rick King - Conductor/Arranger

Musicians
 Andy Timmons - Guitar & Vocals
 Dan Wojciechowski- Drums
 Lee Hendricks - Bass
 Catherine Marx - Key
 Warren Ham - Horns & Vocals
 Steve Real - Background Vocals
 Carmella Ramsey - Background Vocals

Cameo
 Chloe Lattanzi - Herself

Track listing
"Have You Never Been Mellow"
"Magic"
"Xanadu"
"Stronger Than Before"
"If Not for You"
"Let Me Be There"
"Please Mr. Please"
"Jolene"
"If You Love Me, Let Me Know"
"Physical"
"Don't Stop Believin'"
"Dancin'"Written by John Farrar© 1980 John Farrar Music (BMI)
"Suddenly"
"Not Gonna Give In To It"Written by Olivia Newton-John© 1994 Zargon Music (ASCAP)
"Cry Me a River"
"The Rumour"
"Heart Attack"
"Make a Move on Me"
"Twist of Fate"
"Tenterfield Saddler"Written by Peter Allen© 1972 Irving MusicDuet with Peter Allen's archive video
"Can I Trust Your Arms"Music by Olivia Newton-JohnLyrics by Chloe Lattanzi© 2005 Zargon Music (ASCAP), Chloe Rose Music (ASCAP)
"The Promise (The Dolphin Song)"Written by Olivia Newton-John© 1981 Zargon Music (ASCAP)
"You're The One That I Want"
"Hopelessly Devoted to You"
"Summer Nights"
"I Honestly Love You"
"Serenity"Written by Amy Sky & Stephan Moccio© 2005 Latte Music (SOCAN), Sing Little Penguin (SOCAN)

External scenes
In the DVD, the songs are merged with Newton-John and her daughter Chloe Lattanzi and band with visiting the beautiful sights of Sydney. The scenes outside take place mostly at Manly Beach and last about 20 minutes.

External links

Olivia Newton-John video albums
Live video albums
Olivia Newton-John live albums
2008 video albums
2008 live albums
Albums recorded at the Sydney Opera House